Victoria is a village in Knox County, Illinois, United States. The population was 316 at the 2010 census. It is part of the Galesburg Micropolitan Statistical Area.

Geography
Victoria is located in northeastern Knox County at  (41.033192, -90.096997). Illinois Route 167 runs east–west through the center of the village.

Demographics

As of the census of 2000, there were 323 people, 117 households, and 87 families residing in the village. The racial makeup of the village was 99.07% White, and 0.93% from two or more races. Hispanic or Latino of any race were 0.31% of the population.

There were 117 households, out of which 33.3% had children under the age of 18 living with them, 66.7% were married couples living together, 7.7% had a female householder with no husband present, and 24.8% were non-families. 22.2% of all households were made up of individuals, and 16.2% had someone living alone who was 65 years of age or older. The average household size was 2.76 and the average family size was 3.26.

In the village, the population was spread out, with 30.3% under the age of 18, 5.6% from 18 to 24, 26.9% from 25 to 44, 20.7% from 45 to 64, and 16.4% who were 65 years of age or older. The median age was 34 years. For every 100 females, there were 97.0 males. For every 100 females age 18 and over, there were 87.5 males.

The median income for a household in the village was $30,000, and the median income for a family was $32,083. Males had a median income of $28,281 versus $22,917 for females. The per capita income for the village was $13,446. About 3.4% of families and 7.3% of the population were below the poverty line, including 7.7% of those under age 18 and 12.1% of those age 65 or over.

Education 

ROWVA School District #208 is made up of five major towns: Rio, Oneida, Wataga, Victoria, and Altona. PreK-12th grade go to ROWVA in Oneida. ROWVA Central, ROWVA Jr. High, and ROWVA High School are all in one basic building, just different sections. ROWVA's school colors are black, gold, and white, with their mascot being a tiger. Rowva and Williamsfield co-op basketball (maroon and gold.) Since 2009 fall season, ROWVA has also been part of a sports co-op with Galva and Williamsfield where they are the Mid-County Cougars (black, blue, and white.) ROWVA is a part of the Mid-County co-op for golf, cross country, and football.

Notable people
 Bob Swisher, running back for Northwestern and the Chicago Bears

References

Villages in Knox County, Illinois
Villages in Illinois
Galesburg, Illinois micropolitan area